The 2000 World Allround Speed Skating Championships was held on 5–6 February 2000 in the Pettit National Ice Center in Milwaukee. 

Title defenders from the 1999 Championship in the Hamar Vikingskipet were Gunda Niemann-Stirnemann (Germany) and Rintje Ritsma (Netherlands).

German Claudia Pechstein and Dutchman Gianni Romme became world champion.

Women's tournament
24 skaters, 13 from Europe (Germany (4), Netherlands (4), Norway  (2), Russia  (2) and Austria (1)), 4 from North-America (Canada (3) and the United States (1)), 7 from Asia (Japan (3), China (2), Kazakhstan (1) and South Korea (1)), participated. Seven skaters made their World Championship debut.

Emese Hunyady (4th place) participated in her 15th WC Allround tournament and was the first female to reach this milestone.

Men's championships

Allround results

Women's championships

Allround results

Rules 
All 24 participating skaters are allowed to skate the first three distances; 12 skaters may take part on the fourth distance. These 12 skaters are determined by taking the standings on the longest of the first three distances, as well as the samalog standings after three distances, and comparing these lists as follows:

 Skaters among the top 12 on both lists are qualified.
 To make up a total of 12, skaters are then added in order of their best rank on either list. Samalog standings take precedence over the longest-distance standings in the event of a tie.

References
Results on Speedskatingnews

World Allround Speed Skating Championships, 2000
2000 World Allround
World Allround, 2000
Sports competitions in Milwaukee
World Allround
World Allround Speed Skating Championships, 2000
World Allround Speed Skating Championships